F' Debut is the first album by Fiona Sit, released 8 April 2004 it was a best-seller in Hong Kong, and was awarded gold for sales asfit sold more than  25,000 copies.

Track listing
 "XBF" – 4:12
 "麥當娜一吻" (Madonna's kiss) – 2:56
 "奇洛李維斯回信" (Keanu Reeves Reply) – 4:02
 "上帝是男孩" (God is a Boy) – 3:13
 "趕" (Out!) – 3:37
 "小聰明" (Smart) – 3:36
 "醜小鴨天鵝湖" (The Ugly Duckling) – 4:13
 "冬眠" (Hibernate) – 4:09
 "影迷少女" (Cinemamania) – 4:23
 "XBF" (Soft Mix) – 4:03
 "Vie Ya" (Hibernate English Version) – 4:08

References

2004 debut albums
Fiona Sit albums
Warner Music Group albums
Cantonese-language albums